Santa Clara is a former civil parish in the municipality of Coimbra, Portugal. It was also known as São Francisco or São Francisco da Ponte after its foundation in 1855. The population in 2011 was 9,929, in an area of 9.77 km2. On 28 January 2013 it with Castelo Viegas to form Santa Clara e Castelo Viegas.

Cultural heritage, monuments and other attractions
Monastery of Santa Clara-a-Nova (National monument)
Monastery of Santa Clara-a-Velha (National monument)
Quinta das Lágrimas
Portugal dos Pequenitos
Ponte de Santa Clara (bridge)
Coimbra University Stadium

References

Former parishes of Coimbra